The Fiery Angel, Op. 37, is an opera by Russian composer Sergei Prokofiev. The opera was composed between 1919 - 1927. It was premiered posthumously in 1955 in Venice, in Italian language. The work was not presented to Russian audiences until the 1990s, most notably by the Mariinsky Theatre, after the dissolution of the Soviet Union.

Bryusov’s novel

Prokofiev's The Fiery Angel is based on a novel of the same name by Valery Bryusov. Prokofiev was more intrigued by the “orgies” (here, indulgence of passion) presented in the novel rather than the story ideas. The novel was inspired by Bryusov’s own experiences with Nina Petrovskaya, and was considered one of the beginnings of the Russian Symbolist movement known as Vesy, or “The Scales”. Petrovskaya was the mistress of Andrey Bely. In their time together, Petrovskaya also came to know Bryusov in 1904, which sparked concerns for Bely. There was an anticipated brawl on a remote road in Moscow, but a mutual friend of Bryusov and Bely prevented the fight. Petrovskaya, Bely,and Bryusov inspired Prokofiev’s characters in his opera, making the novel the prime source of inspiration for the work. The novel was also the basis for the libretto of Prokofiev’s opera, which the composer himself wrote with the help of Demchinsky.

Synopsis

The opera was originally composed of three acts and eleven scenes but was eventually reorganized into five acts and seven scenes.

Act 1
Renata, a young woman searching for a missing love, resides at an inn. Ruprecht, a knight errant, meets Renata at the inn.  She tells him that, since her childhood, she has been in love with an angel. This angel, Madiel, encouraged her to do good deeds, and at the age of seventeen she finally asked for his physical love.  The angel, in response, glowed in fury, but agreed to return in human form. After Madiel’s promise, Renata had met Count Heinrich von Otterheim.  Convinced that this was her angel returned to Earth, Renata immediately gave herself to him.  One year later, Otterheim left.  In denial, Renata begs Ruprecht to help her search for Otterheim.

Act 2
As the two search for Otterheim, Ruprecht soon falls in love with Renata, although she does not share the feeling.  They decide to resort to sorcery to find Otterheim, and a spell is cast. Three knocks are then heard at the door.  Renata assumes the spell has worked and nearly goes insane at the thought of Otterheim returning.  But nobody is there.  Ruprecht and Renata seek out the powerful sorcerer Agrippa von Nettesheim. Once in his lair, they are met with his refusal to help; his concerns lie with the power of the Inquisition.

Act 3
Ruprecht learns that Renata has finally found Count Heinrich von Otterheim, who has rejected her.  She begs to be avenged, learning that he was never her angel.  Ruprecht attempts to exact revenge for Renata by dueling with Otterheim. The duel is one-sided, as Otterheim easily overcomes Ruprecht and injures him.

Act 4
Ruprecht and Renata have moved in together, but Renata now insists on joining a convent to better herself and for her soul’s sake. There is a comic relief, involving Faust and Mephistopheles at a tavern. (This tavern scene, used to break up the dark sarcastic nature of the opera, is sometimes left out.)

Act 5
Renata is in the convent, where the leaders accuse her of demonic possession.  As an attempt to heal Renata ensues, all Hell essentially breaks loose (both on stage and in the orchestra) as the other nuns are also possessed.  She is condemned by the Inquisitor to be burned at the stake.

History
With no previous commissions or any actual production being present, Prokofiev set out to write The Fiery Angel at one of the only times of his life in which religion was considered for his works. The thematic style is more like Prokofiev’s pre-Revolution operas (such as The Gambler), even with the ambiguity.  The only theme that strays from the ambiguous is the theme involved with the evil forces.   

The opera as a whole is a contrast to some of Prokofiev’s earlier operas (such as his opera The Love for Three Oranges) just by being a tragedy, and the story was considered very appropriate for Prokofiev’s dark and sarcastic style. 

Prokofiev faced several challenges during the production of the opera. There was a large amount of extra material in the work, there were what was considered violations of theater, negotiations with different theaters both in Europe and America continued to fail.  In the midst of it all, Prokofiev felt like he was unappreciated and unwanted, but his pride kept him striving for recognition.  

In 1926, Bruno Walter made Prokofiev an offer to have The Fiery Angel produced at a Berlin theater, which prompted the composer to work on the orchestration.  The orchestration was finished in 1927. The production was still unsuccessful. The opera and inspiration came and went, but it was the promises of production that kept Prokofiev writing. 

Prokofiev, who had been working on the opera for years, was reluctant to let the music languish unperformed, and after hearing a concert performance of its second act given by Serge Koussevitzky in June 1928, he adapted parts of the opera to make his Symphony No. 3 in C minor, Op. 44, later that year.

Reception

	The Fiery Angel was met with mixed reviews for different reasons.  Largely, The Fiery Angel was, despite lack of productions, reviewed as Prokofiev’s “… strongest and most dramatically intense scores.” In a review of the Bolshoi performance of The Fiery Angel, it is said that Prokofiev’s “…score is crazy, but shouldn’t sound chaotic.” Prokofiev may have only been interested in the overarching story rather than the smaller details.  It was also criticized that maybe the language would have been better in French rather than Russian. Some even called the opera a “16th-century Carmen with supernatural trimmings” amongst other mixed reviews.  Another criticism is that The Fiery Angel is nothing but confusion and noise with the “modern” title. Using staging should not be there to make up for the music, but to mix with it and make a grand production. Prokofiev was able to write the music how he saw fit, which appealed to many more than the staging has, according to different reviews.

Recordings
The first was recorded in 1957, conducted by Charles Bruck with the Orchestra of the Paris Opera. The opera was performed in French with Xavier Depraz and Jane Rhodes in the leading roles.
The first Russian-language recording was released in 1990, conducted by Prokofiev specialist Neeme Järvi with the Gothenburg Symphony Orchestra, starring Nadine Secunde and Siegfried Lorenz as Renata and Ruprecht with Bryn Terfel, Heinz Zednik and Kurt Moll in supporting roles.
Valery Gergiev, who has recorded a wide array of Russian operas with the Kirov Opera, released a recording taped from a series of performances at the Kirov opera, with Sergei Leiferkus and Galina Gorchakova as Ruprecht and Renata.

Source:  Recordings of The Fiery Angel on operadis-opera-discography.org.uk

References

Further reading

External links 

The Fiery Angel, Op 37 at Prokofiev.org
The Fiery Angel by Tony Rothman

Operas by Sergei Prokofiev
Operas set in Germany
Russian-language operas
Operas
1927 operas
1954 operas
Operas based on novels